WINT (1330 kHz) – branded Integrity Radio – is a commercial talk AM radio station licensed to Willoughby, Ohio, serving Lake County and eastern parts of Greater Cleveland. Owned by Spirit Broadcasting, LLC, WINT serves as a local affiliate for the Columbus Blue Jackets Radio Network; Indianapolis Motor Speedway Radio Network; Motor Racing Network; Performance Racing Network; The Sean Hannity Show and The Dave Ramsey Show. The station also airs programs hosted by nationally-syndicated personalities Doug Stephan, Armstrong & Getty and Dana Loesch, as well as local coverage of the Lake County Captains. In addition to a standard analog transmission, WINT is relayed over low-power Willoughby FM translator W268CO (101.5 FM), and is available online.

History
The station first broadcast on January 27, 1965, as WELW. As the station's transmitter site (and current studio site) resides on the Eastlake-Willoughby border, the call letters stood for EastLake and Willoughby. WELW's first format was religious; subsequently, it has had Top 40, country music, oldies, and news/talk formats. WELW almost always has broadcast nationality music shows and some religious programs. Spirit Broadcasting (a Petkovsek-Somich Company) assumed ownership in February 1990, and this has been the longest ownership in station history. Over the years, the station has been honored countless times for its community service, as well as receiving Associated Press awards.

On March 31, 2014, WELW announced that they had changed their call letters to WINT, and adopted the brand of "Integrity Radio". The station also announced its intention to upgrade their signal to serve more of the Cleveland radio market, as well as finding an FM station on which to simulcast. In July 2015, WINT began broadcasting on 101.5FM.

FM translator

Current programming
WINT offers a variety of programming, including national talk radio programs hosted by Doug Stephan, Armstrong & Getty, Sean Hannity, Dana Loesch and Dave Ramsey. Nationality programming is also aired on Sunday mornings, including Slovenian, Croatian, Italian, German, Polish, and Hispanic shows. WINT offers a small part of its broadcast schedule for purchase by program providers.

WINT was the flagship station of the Lake County Captains minor league baseball team when they moved to Ohio in 2003. Now, the Captains are broadcast on 88.7 WJCU. In 2014, WINT added NASCAR and IndyCar races to its programming. The station also broadcasts area high school football and basketball games, and occasionally Lake Erie College Football games, as well as locally produced and originated shows focusing on sports talk, tech and computer, business and legal, plus veterans and senior issues.

With the realization that many polka music fans from Ohio and the Steel Belt have retired to warmer climates, WINT also began and serves as base operation for a 24/7 streaming polka website, 247polkaheaven.com which was the first of its kind in the world. Known as the "World's Polka Network", it features polka hosts and music from across the United States and Canada.

References

External links

247PolkaHeaven.com
 FCC History Cards For WINT (AM) (1962-1980)
FM translator

1965 establishments in Ohio
Radio stations established in 1965
INT
Talk radio stations in the United States